Sumner Township is one of sixteen townships in Buchanan County, Iowa, USA.  As of the 2000 census, its population was 3,148.

Geography 

According to the USGS, it contains four cemeteries: Mount Hope, Oakwood, State Hospital and Wilson.

References

External links 

 US-Counties.com
 City-Data.com

Townships in Buchanan County, Iowa
Townships in Iowa